Henry O. Schowalter (August 4, 1909 – March 24, 1998) was a member of the Wisconsin State Assembly.

Biography
Schowalter was born on August 4, 1909 in Jackson, Washington County, Wisconsin. He died on March 24, 1998.

Career
Schowalter was a member of the Assembly during the 1937 session. He was an unsuccessful candidate in 1938. Schowalter was a Democrat.

References

External links
Mocavo
The Political Graveyard

People from Jackson, Washington County, Wisconsin
1909 births
1998 deaths
20th-century American politicians
Democratic Party members of the Wisconsin State Assembly